Deán Funes is a city in the province of Córdoba, Argentina. It is the largest city in the northwest of the province. It lies by National Route 60, 118 km from the provincial capital Córdoba.

The settlement was founded as Villa de Deán Funes on 9 March 1875, when the Ferrocarril Central Norte from Córdoba reached the area. It received its name honouring Gregorio Funes, a writer and deacon of the Archdiocese of Córdoba who was a deputy to the Junta Grande after the May Revolution of 1810. It received a strong wave of immigration, chiefly made up of Spaniards, Italians, people from Arab countries, and Yugoslavians. The town was officially declared a city on 29 October 1929.

The city hosts the Northern Córdoba Tradition Festival annually in the first half of January.

References
 
 Municipality of Deán Funes — Official website.
  Deán Funes at LiveArgentina.com.

Populated places in Córdoba Province, Argentina
Populated places established in 1875
Cities in Argentina
1875 establishments in Argentina